Hugo Domingos Gomes (born 4 January 1995) is a Brazilian footballer who plays for Portuguese club Moreirense on loan from Rio Ave as a central defender.

Club career
Born in Campo Grande, Mato Grosso do Sul, Hugo Gomes started his career with Los Angeles FC in his hometown, aged only five. In 2008 he was invited for a trial at São Paulo FC, joining its youth setup in 2009 at the age of 13.

On 14 July 2015 Hugo Gomes renewed his contract until the end of 2017, being loaned to RCD Mallorca a day later. However, he only featured for the reserves in Tercera División.

On 24 August 2016, Hugo Gomes moved to another reserve team, Granada CF B in Segunda División B. After featuring sparingly, he returned to São Paulo, representing the B-side until the end of the year.

On 29 December 2017, Hugo Gomes joined Atlético Goianiense also in a temporary deal. The following 16 July, after being rarely used, he agreed to a three-year deal with LigaPro side F.C. Famalicão.

Hugo Gomes made his professional debut on 11 August 2018, starting in a 0–1 away loss against S.C. Farense. He made just nine more appearances as they were promoted to Primeira Liga as runners-up, and scored in a 4–2 home comeback win over FC Porto B on 27 October.

Hugo Gomes returned to the second tier on loan for 2019–20, at Varzim SC. He played 22 total games while in Póvoa de Varzim, and scored once to equalise in a 2–1 loss away to eventual double winners FC Porto in the quarter-finals of the Taça de Portugal on 14 January.

On 13 July 2021, he moved to Rio Ave on a two-year contract. On 3 August 2022, Gomes joined Moreirense on a season-long loan.

References

External links

1995 births
People from Campo Grande
Sportspeople from Mato Grosso do Sul
Living people
Brazilian footballers
Association football defenders
São Paulo FC players
RCD Mallorca B players
Club Recreativo Granada players
Atlético Clube Goianiense players
F.C. Famalicão players
Varzim S.C. players
G.D. Estoril Praia players
Rio Ave F.C. players
Moreirense F.C. players
Segunda División B players
Tercera División players
Liga Portugal 2 players
Brazilian expatriate footballers
Expatriate footballers in Spain
Brazilian expatriate sportspeople in Spain
Expatriate footballers in Portugal
Brazilian expatriate sportspeople in Portugal